Melora may refer to:

 Melora (moth)
 Melora (Dungeons & Dragons)
 "Melora" (Star Trek Deep Space Nine)
 Melora (novel), a mystery novel by Mignon G. Eberhart

People with the name
 Melora Creager (born 1966), American singer-songwriter and cellist
 Melora Hardin (born 1967), American actress and singer
 Melora Walters (born 1959), American actress